St. John's is a congregation of the Lutheran Church–Missouri Synod located in New Boston, Michigan. The church also operates an elementary school for children from preschool through eighth grade.

History
The church has its roots in a group of German families living in Ash Township in 1856. Pastor Hermann Lemke of Raisinville Township held the first German Evangelical Lutheran service on November 23, 1856 in the home of a member of the congregation. Several months later, services were being held twice a month with all services conducted in German. The church was formally established on Easter Sunday April 13, 1857 with the official name of St. John's Evangelical Lutheran Congregation of the unaltered Augsburg Confession.

Mission
St. John's mission statement reads:

"To extend to others the love God has shown to us. 
To follow His command, "When God's children are in need, you be the one to help them out." (Romans 12:13). 
To help meet spiritual and psycho-social needs of our church members, especially those with special needs, such as the homebound, ill, grieving, alone, lonely or despondent."

External links
Official site
LCMS congregation profile

References
St. John's Lutheran Church and School (New Boston). History. Retrieved May 11, 2007.

Lutheran churches in Michigan
Religious organizations established in 1857
19th-century Lutheran churches in the United States
Churches in Wayne County, Michigan
Lutheran schools in Michigan
1857 establishments in Michigan
Lutheran Church–Missouri Synod churches
Schools affiliated with the Lutheran Church–Missouri Synod